Alexander Besher (born in China in 1951) is an author of fiction and non-fiction. In addition to novels, screenplays and teleplays, he is a journalist, consulting futurist on Pacific Rim affairs (for the San Francisco-based Global Business Network, the corporate future scenarios think-tank) former editor of Chicago Review and co-founder of The Chicago Review Press (1973–present).

Biography

Alexander  Besher's formative years were in Japan where he grew up and lived for twenty years, graduating from Canadian Academy High School in Kobe and Sophia University in Tokyo.

Besher was contributing editor of InfoWorld. He wrote the internationally syndicated weekly column "Pacific Rim", covering business trends, technology, and cultural trends for a period of six years for The San Francisco Chronicle.  This led to his authoring and editing the compendium The Pacific Rim Almanac.

Works

Novels
Rim Trilogy: science fiction, set in Japan in the 2020s and 2030s (HarperCollins and Simon & Schuster)
Rim, Philip K. Dick Award nominee
Mir
Chi
Kabbalah noir genre: literary supernatural action adventure exorcism tales in the style of Hasidic fables.
The Clinging, novel and screenplay, set in contemporary San Francisco
The Night of the Golem, semi-sequel set in Nazi Berlin
The Unchosen, semi-sequel set in 1939/40 Shanghai

Transmedia
The Manga Man (2008)

References

External links

1951 births
20th-century American novelists
20th-century American male writers
American male novelists
American science fiction writers
Writers from California
Living people